The 2011 World Netball Series was the third edition of the World Netball Series, an annual international netball competition held under fastnet rules. The 2011 event was held in Liverpool, England, which also hosted the event in 2010. The tournament was contested by the top six national netball teams from the previous year, according to the IFNA World Rankings.

At the end of the preliminary round-robin matches, Australia, England, Jamaica and New Zealand progressed to the semi-finals, while South Africa and Fiji contested the 5th/6th place playoff match. England and New Zealand advanced to the final, with Australia eventually finishing third. In the final match of the tournament, England defeated New Zealand by 33–26 to claim their first gold medal in a major netball tournament.

Overview

Date and venue
The 2011 World Netball Series was played in Liverpool over three days, from 25–27 November. All matches were held at the Echo Arena Liverpool, which has a seating capacity of 7,500 for sporting events.

Format
The tournament comprised 20 matches played over three days. The six teams played each other once during the first two days in a round-robin format. At the end of two days, the four highest-ranked teams from this stage progressed to the finals, played on the final day of competition, in which the 1st-ranked team played the 4th-ranked team, while 2nd played 3rd. The winners of these two matches contested the Grand Final; the remaining teams competed in third- and fifth-place playoffs.

Teams
The top six international netball teams contest the World Netball Series each year. Five teams returned from the previous tournament; Malawi were replaced by Fiji in 2011.

Fixtures and results
Match results from Netball New Zealand.

Day 1

Day 2

Day 3

Final placings

Medallists

References

External links
 Official website

2011
World
World
International sports competitions in Liverpool
2011 in Australian netball
2011 in New Zealand netball
2011 in English netball
2011 in South African women's sport
2011 in Fijian sport
2011 in Jamaican sport